Othonna is a genus of approximately 90 species of succulent or subsucculent perennial herbs or shrubs, with its center of diversity in the Greater Cape Floristic Region (GCFR) of South Africa but some species' ranges include southern Namibia, Angola, and Zimbabwe. The genus was established by Linnaeus in 1753 containing 14 species, however, of those original species, only four are still retained in Othonna, while the others have been transferred to different genera including Cineraria, Euryops, Hertia, Ligularia, Senecio, and Tephroseris. The genus Othonnna is known to be monophyletic. In 2012, a new genus Crassothonna B. Nord. was erected with 13 species transferred from Othonna. A complete modern taxonomic treatment of the genus is being undertaken by the Compton Herbarium and the South African National Biodiversity Institute. The first part, a revision of the Othonnna bulbosa group (those species that are geophytic with an aerial stem), was published in 2019.

The name Othonna is derived from the Ancient Greek ὄθοννα and the Latin othone, which is a linen cloth or napkin, in allusion to the downy covering of some of the earlier known species.

Several species in the Othonna and Crassothonna are commonly called bobbejaankool in Afrikaans which translates to baboon cress or baboon cabbages. 

Species in the Othonna bulbosa group

 Species

References

External links

 
Asteraceae genera
Flora of Southern Africa